Utah State Route 2 may refer to:

 Utah State Route 2 (1962-1977), the former state highway designation (legislative overlay) for most of Interstate 80 (except its concurrency with Interstate 15) in Utah, United States, which runs through Tooele, Salt Lake, and Summit counties
 Utah State Route 2 (1920s-1962), a former state highway designation (legislative overlay) for a section of U.S. Route 89 in Cache and Rich counties in Utah, United States, that ran from Logan to Garden City

See also

 List of state highways in Utah
 List of Interstate Highways in Utah
 List of named highway junctions in Utah
 List of highways numbered 2

External links

 Utah Department of Transportation Highway Resolutions: Route 2 (PDF)